Gina Farmer (born 12 December 1974) is a New Zealand former basketball player who competed in the 2000 Summer Olympics and in the 2004 Summer Olympics. Farmer also competed for New Zealand at the 1994 World Championship held in Australia.

References

1974 births
Living people
New Zealand women's basketball players
Olympic basketball players of New Zealand
Basketball players at the 2000 Summer Olympics
Basketball players at the 2004 Summer Olympics